Imbira is a genus of land planarians found in South America.

Description 
The genus Imibira is characterized by having a large, slender and flat body with parallel margins, reaching up to 14 cm in length. The eyes are arranged along the body margins, not occupying the dorsum. In comparison to other genera, the body has an additional layer of longitudinal muscles dorsally and ventrally to the intestine. The copulatory apparatus lacks a permanent penis, i. e., the penis is formed during copulation by folds in the male cavity. The female cavity is rounded and filled with a multilayered epithelium.

Etymology 
Imbira is a word in the Tupi language that refers to a strip of bark peeled off from certain trees.

Species 
There are four species assigned to the genus Imbira:

Imbira flanovigra Amaral & Leal-Zanchet, 2018
Imbira guaiana (Leal-Zanchet & Carbayo, 2001)
Imbira marcusi Carbayo et al., 2013
Imbira negrita Negrete & Brusa, 2017

References 

Geoplanidae
Rhabditophora genera